In Norse mythology, Norðri, Suðri, Austri and Vestri ("Northern, Southern, Eastern and Western") are four dwarves in the Prose Edda book Gylfaginning who each support one of the four cardinal points. Together, they uphold the heavenly dome, created from the skull of the jötunn Ymir. They probably represent the four winds, corresponding to the four stags of the cosmic tree Yggdrasil.

See also
 Anemoi
 Eostre
 Eye of Horus
 Four Evangelists
 Four Heavenly Kings
 Four Holy Beasts
 Four Living Creatures
 Four sons of Horus
 Four Stags (Norse mythology)
 Four Symbols
 Four temperaments
 Great Year
 Guardians of the directions
 Lokapala
 Royal stars
 Tetramorph
 Titan

Notes

Norse dwarves
Fictional quartets
Wind gods
Ymir